Sub Teniente Nestor Arias Airport  is an airport serving San Felipe, a town in the Yaracuy state of Venezuela.

The San Felipe non-directional beacon (Ident: SPE) is located near the northeastern end of the runway.

See also
Transport in Venezuela
List of airports in Venezuela

References

External links
 OpenStreetMap - San Felipe
 OurAirports - San Felipe
 SkyVector - San Felipe

Airports in Venezuela